Time in Senegal is given by a single time zone, denoted as Greenwich Mean Time (GMT; UTC±00:00). Senegal shares this time zone with several other countries, including fourteen in western Africa. Senegal does not observe daylight saving time (DST).

History 
Senegal first adopted UTC−01:00 on 1 January 1912.

IANA time zone database 
In the IANA time zone database, Senegal is given one zone in the file zone.tab – Africa/Dakar. "SN" refers to the country's ISO 3166-1 alpha-2 country code. Data for Senegal directly from zone.tab of the IANA time zone database; columns marked with * are the columns from zone.tab itself:

See also 
Time in Africa
List of time zones by country

References

External links 
Current time in Senegal at Time.is
Time in Senegal at TimeAndDate.com

Time in Senegal